The North Branch Potomac River flows from Fairfax Stone in West Virginia to its confluence with the South Branch Potomac River near Green Spring, West Virginia, where it turns into the Potomac River proper.

Course 

From the Fairfax Stone, the North Branch Potomac River flows  to the man-made Jennings Randolph Lake, an impoundment designed for flood control and emergency water supply. Below the dam, the North Branch cuts a serpentine path through the eastern Allegheny Mountains. First, it flows northeast by the communities of Bloomington, Luke, and Westernport in Maryland and then on by Keyser, West Virginia to Cumberland, Maryland. At Cumberland, the river turns southeast.  downstream from its source, the North Branch is joined by the South Branch between Green Spring and South Branch Depot, West Virginia from whence it flows past Hancock, Maryland and turns southeast once more on its way toward Washington, D.C., and the Chesapeake Bay.

Water quality 

Historically, the North Branch had highly acidic water due to waste from coal mining and paper production in the region. In 1969, one measuring station recorded a pH of 2.3, comparable to lemon juice. This regularly killed wildlife across a  span. It was somewhat mitigated by the construction of the Bloomington Dam, which allowed for flow control based on density. The dam was constructed in 1981; by 1987, the pH had returned to the neutral range in some areas, but dissolved aluminum and manganese concentrations were still at toxic levels, which continued to impede full wildlife recovery. In 1990, Maryland installed lime dosers, devices which dispense alkaline lime into the river, to further mitigate acidity in problem spots. This was successful, and today fish can survive in the river again.

Tributaries 

 Stony River (West Virginia)
 Abram Creek (West Virginia)
 Savage River (Maryland)
 Georges Creek (Maryland)
 Laurel Run (Maryland)
 New Creek (West Virginia)
 Limestone Run (West Virginia)
 Warrior Run (Maryland)
 Wills Creek (Pennsylvania/Maryland)
 Brush Creek (Pennsylvania)
 Little Wills Creek (Pennsylvania)
 Evitts Creek (Maryland and Pennsylvania)
 Patterson Creek (West Virginia)
 Mill Creek (West Virginia)
 Dans Run (West Virginia)
 Green Spring Run (West Virginia)

References 

Rivers of West Virginia
Rivers of Maryland
Tributaries of the Potomac River